Mk II was the second album of the British rock band Steamhammer.

Background
For this LP, drummer Michael Ruston was replaced by Mick Bradley  (who stayed with the band through to their final LP in 1972, Speech). Guitarist Martin Quittenton had also departed, to focus on songwriting (primarily with Rod Stewart)  and sax and flute player Steve Jolliffe was added to the lineup (he later joined  Tangerine Dream).

Track listing

Personnel

Band members
Kieran White - vocals, acoustic guitar, harmonica, jew's harp
Steve Jolliffe - soprano and alto flutes, alto and tenor saxophones, harpsichord, vocals
Martin Pugh - electric and acoustic guitar
Steve Davy - bass
Mick Bradley - drums, percussion, conga

Additional personnel
Fritz Fryer - Producer
John Hawkins - Producer
Paul Tregurtha - Engineer
Mike Bobak - Engineer

Product details
 Audio CD (July 18, 2006)
 Original release date: 1969
 Number of discs: 1
 Format: Import
 Label: Repertoire
 ASIN: B000025R1K

References

External links
 Prog Archives information
 Steamhammer official website by Martin Pugh

Steamhammer (band) albums
1969 albums
Columbia Records albums
CBS Records albums
Repertoire Records albums